The 1997 Delaware Fightin' Blue Hens football team represented the University of Delaware as a member of the Mid-Atlantic Division of the Atlantic 10 Conference (A-10) during the 1997 NCAA Division I-AA football season. Led by 32nd-year head coach Tubby Raymond, the Fightin' Blue Hens compiled an overall record of 12–2 with a mark of 7–1 in conference play, placing second in the A-10's Mid-Atlantic Division. For the sixth time in seven sessions, Delaware advanced to the NCAA Division I-AA Football Championship playoffs, where the Fightin' Blue Hens beat  in the first round and Georgia Southern in the quarterfinals before losing to the eventual national runner-up, McNeese State, in the semifinals. The team played home games at Delaware Stadium in Newark, Delaware.

Schedule

References

Delaware
Delaware Fightin' Blue Hens football seasons
Delaware Fightin' Blue Hens football